Darryl Brent Waltz Jr. (born September 7, 1973) is an American politician and businessman. He served in the Indiana Senate from 2005 to 2017, representing southern Marion County and northern Johnson County which comprise the 36th Senate District of Indiana following his defeat of Senate Finance Chairman Larry Borst in the May 2004 Republican primary election. His investment banking company, The Baron Group, Inc., specializes in mergers, acquisitions, and capitalization of small to midsize private companies in the transportation and manufacturing industries. In 2016 Waltz announced he would not seek reelection in order to run for Indiana's 9th congressional district being vacated by Congressman Todd Young.  Waltz was unsuccessful in this campaign and subsequently indicted for violating federal campaign finance law.

Early life 
Darryl Brent Waltz Jr. was born in Indianapolis, Indiana on September 7, 1973 to Darryl Brent Waltz, Sr. and Geraldine Chaney Waltz. He is an only child.  His father was a senior vice president of an Indiana savings and loan. Waltz graduated from Center Grove High School in 1992 as a National Merit Scholar.  At 16, he became an Eagle Scout with bronze, silver, and gold palms. After high school, he attended Wabash College where he completed his degree as a history major with a minor in political science in 3 years.

Political career 
Three out of four of Waltz's great-grandfathers held elected office in Indiana and Kentucky. At the age of 26 he was elected an at-large member of the Johnson County Council in 2000. He was elected President of the Johnson County in 2003 and re-election his last year on the council in 2004.

In a political upset, Waltz unseated 36-year incumbent and Senate Finance Committee chairman Larry Borst in the 2004 Republican primary by just 34 votes—6,062 to 6,024. He defeated his Democratic opponent in the November 2004 election and was reelected to a second term in 2008. Subsequently, in 2012 he won re-election for a third term.

Waltz announced he would not seek re-election for his Senate seat in 2016 in order to pursue Indiana's 9th congressional district being vacated by congressman Todd Young.

Business career 
In 1995 Waltz founded his investment banking company, The Baron Group, Inc. - named after a company in a Jeffery Archer novel.  In 2001 Waltz and two business partners began a logistics and courier company named Velox Express.

Scandal and criminal indictment 
On September 29, 2020, Waltz was indicted on 5 counts related to violations of federal campaign finance law related to his 2016 campaign. On April 12, 2022 Brent Waltz pleaded guilty to two felony counts, making and receiving conduit contributions and making false statements to the FBI. On August 17, 2022, District Judge James R. Sweeney II sentenced Waltz to ten months in prison in addition to being supervised by the U.S. Probation Office for two years following his release from federal prison and to pay a $40,500 fine.

References

External links 
 Indiana Senate Republicans
 VeLOX Espress 
 IndyStar. Article
 

Republican Party Indiana state senators
Living people
1973 births
Politicians from Indianapolis
Wabash College alumni
Businesspeople from Indianapolis
21st-century American politicians
Indiana politicians convicted of crimes